Guy Burruss Gardner (March 18, 1920 – December 11, 1980) was an American football coach and college athletics administrator.  He was the eighth head football coach at Howard Payne University in Brownwood, Texas, serving for three seasons, from 1953 to 1955, and compiling a record of 18–9–2. Gardner came to Howard Payne from Borger High School in Borger, Texas, where was head football coach in 1951 and 1952.  He died after a long illness in 1980.

Head coaching record

College

References

External links
 

1920 births
1980 deaths
Howard Payne Yellow Jackets athletic directors
Howard Payne Yellow Jackets football coaches
High school football coaches in Texas
People from Idabel, Oklahoma